Edwin Jackson (born September 18, 1989) is a French professional basketball player for Nanterre 92 of the LNB Pro A. Standing at , he plays at the shooting guard position.

Professional career
Jackson played with ASVEL Lyon-Villeurbanne's youth team as a junior. He made thirty appearances for the club's senior team in the 2007–08 season, his first full season with the club.  He was later loaned to Pro-B team JSF Nanterre for the 2008–09 season and Pro-A team SPO Rouen Basket for the 2009–10 season.  In the 2009–10 season, he averaged 10.7 points, 3 rebounds, and 1 steal per game.  He was selected to the French League All-Star Game as a result of his performance. He returned to ASVEL in 2010.

Jackson initially declared as an early-entry candidate for the 2010 NBA draft before withdrawing his name from consideration. He eventually went undrafted in the 2011 NBA draft, due to auto-eligibility at age 22.

He won French Pro A MVP honors in 2013 and led the league in scoring, in the 2013–14 season (18.2 points per game).

On 20 December 2014, Jackson moved to the Spanish League club FC Barcelona, where he signed for the remainder of the 2014–15 season. On 8 July 2015, he signed a one-year contract with the Spanish club Unicaja Málaga.

On 15 August 2016, he signed a one-year deal with Estudiantes.

On June 21, 2017, Jackson signed with the Guangdong Southern Tigers of the Chinese Basketball Association. On January 5, 2018, Jackson was waived by the Guangdong Southern Tigers after the team lost 96-104 against Xinjiang Flying Tigers. On January 29, 2018, he returned to FC Barcelona, signing a contract for the rest of the 2017–18 season.

On June 13, 2018, Edwin signed a contract with Montenegrin club Budućnost Voli Podgorica.

On June 28, 2019, he has signed 4-year deal with LDLC ASVEL of the LNB Pro A.

On August 26, 2022, he has signed with Nanterre 92 of the LNB Pro A.

National team career

French junior national team
Jackson played with the junior national teams of France at each level of junior basketball. He appeared for the team at the 2006 FIBA Europe Under-18 Championship, 2007 FIBA Under-19 World Cup, and the 2008 and 2009 FIBA Europe Under-20 Championships. In 2006, he helped the French Under-18 team to a gold medal; and followed that up with a bronze medal in the Under-19 World Cup the following year. In the 2009 European Under-20 tournament, Jackson scored a game-high 32 points in the gold medal game, although the French fell short, winning the silver medal.

French senior national team
Jackson was selected to the senior men's French national basketball team for the first time, at the 2010 FIBA World Championship. At only 20 years of age, he was the second youngest member of the French team at the tournament. He won a bronze medal at the 2014 FIBA World Cup.

Career statistics

EuroLeague

|-
| style="text-align-left;"| 2014–15
| style="text-align-left;"| Barcelona
| 11 || 6 || 12.8 || .303 || .200 || .833 || 1.4 || 1.3 || .4 || .0 || 3.0 || 2.7
|-
| style="text-align-left;"| 2015–16
| style="text-align-left;"| Unicaja
| 24 || 10 || 20.1 || .392 || .328 || .857 || 1.4 || 2.5 || .2 || .0 || 8.9 || 8.0
|-
| style="text-align-left;"| 2017–18
| style="text-align-left;"| Barcelona
| 9 || 2 || 14.6 || .457 || .455 || 1.000 || 1.9 || 1.2 || .8 || .0 || 4.6 || 5.3
|- class="sortbottom"
| style="text-align=center;" colspan="2"| Career
| 44 || 18 || 17.2 || .389 || .324 || .862 || 1.5 || 1.9 || .3 || .0 || 6.5 || 6.1

Personal life
Edwin is the son of Skeeter Jackson, who was born in Louisiana, and played college basketball at Southwestern Oklahoma State University. He later played professionally in France, where he met Caroline, Edwin's mother. After receiving French citizenship, Skeeter Jackson had 41 caps with the senior French men's national team, between 1987 and 1989.

References

External links 

 
 Edwin Jackson at aba-liga.com
 Edwin Jackson at draftexpress.com
 Edwin Jackson at eurobasket.com
 Edwin Jackson at euroleague.net
 Edwin Jackson at fiba.com

1989 births
Living people
2010 FIBA World Championship players
2014 FIBA Basketball World Cup players
ABA League players
ASVEL Basket players
Baloncesto Málaga players
Black French sportspeople
CB Estudiantes players
FC Barcelona Bàsquet players
French expatriate basketball people in China
French expatriate basketball people in Montenegro
French expatriate basketball people in Spain
French men's basketball players
French people of African-American descent
Guangdong Southern Tigers players
KK Budućnost players
Liga ACB players
Nanterre 92 players
Shooting guards
Sportspeople from Pau, Pyrénées-Atlantiques